Rzędów  is a village in the administrative district of Gmina Turawa, within Opole County, Opole Voivodeship, in south-western Poland.

The village has a population of 312.

History
The village of Friedrichsfelde was founded as a colony in the 18th century. In 1840 the colony had 224 inhabitants.

It was renamed in 1945, after the region became part of Poland under the terms of the Potsdam Agreement.

References

Villages in Opole County